Chantal Rodriguez is the Associate Dean of the Yale School of Drama and a scholar of Latino theater.

Career 
Rodriguez graduated from Santa Clara University in 2003 with a bachelor's degree in Theater Arts and Spanish Studies. In 2009, she received her doctorate from the University of California, Los Angeles in Theater and Performance Studies.

In 2009, Rodriguez became Programming Director and Literary Manager at the Latino Theater Company. She worked at the LTC for seven years. In 2016, Rodriguez was hired as the Assistant Dean at the Yale School of Drama and was promoted to Associate Dean in 2017. She oversaw student life matters, works on equity, diversity, and inclusion initiatives, teaches in the dramaturgy and dramatic criticism department, and serves as the School's Title IX Coordinator.

Rodriguez currently serves on the Advisory Committee of the Latinx Theatre Commons and the National Advisory Board of the 50 Playwrights Project, which works to spread the works of Latino playwrights and support dialogues about Latino art.

Rodriguez has worked as an adjunct lecturer at several universities, including UCLA, California Institute of the Arts, California State University, Northridge, Emerson College Los Angeles and Loyola Marymount University.

Publications 
Rodriguez's work has been published in the Theatre Journal, Latin American Theatre Review, e-misférica and Theatre Research International. In 2019, she co-edited a volume of the Theater Magazine dedicated to Latino theater, with the Magazine's editor Tom Sellar.

Rodriguez is the author of The Latino Theatre Initiative/Center Theatre Group Papers, 1980-2005, the first historical account of the Latino Theatre Initiative housed at the Mark Taper Forum. Published in 2011 by UCLA's Chicano Studies Research Center, the book was an effort to expand scholarship on Latino art and encourage further study in the field.

Rodriguez is also the co-editor of Encuentro: Latinx Performance for the New American Theater (2019), an anthology of plays from the 2014 Encuentro festival produced by the Latino Theater Company. Published by Northwestern University Press and co-edited with Trevor Boffone and Teresa Marrero, the anthology is meant to serve as a resource and features the works of six Latino playwrights from the Encuentro festival.

Awards 

Rodriguez received accolades for her scholarship on Latino theater. Her book, The Latino Theatre Initiative/Center Theatre Group Papers, 1980-2005 was nominated for three Latino Literacy Now International Book Awards. Moreover, she was recognized in 2011 as a Young Leader of Color by the Theater Communications Group, an award created to "gather groups of early-career theatre professionals of color from around the US at TCG’s National Conferences to engage in a dialogue about the new generation of leadership." Rodriguez was one of only 79 individuals recognized over eight years in the program. 

In 2016, Rodriguez received the Rainbow Award from the Los Angeles Women's Theater Festival, an accolade presented to artists or individuals for their "diverse contributions in fostering non-traditional and multicultural theatre works." Moreover, in the same year, she was a finalist in the Richard E. Sherwood Award presented by the Center Theatre Group to individuals who are "extending frontiers, experimenting, challenging the theatrical norm, [and] finding new forms of artistic expression" in Los Angeles.

References 

Year of birth missing (living people)
Living people
American theatre people
Yale University faculty
Santa Clara University alumni
University of California, Los Angeles alumni
Yale School of Drama faculty